Imam Mohammad Ibn Saud Islamic University (IMSIU), commonly known as Al-Imam University, is a public university in al-Shemal, Riyadh, Saudi Arabia. It was founded in 1950 as an Islamic seminary by Muhammad ibn Ibrahim ash-Sheikh, the first Grand Mufti of Saudi Arabia. It later got evolved as the College of Sharia in 1953 before turning into a full-fledged university and assuming its current name in 1974. The university also has overseas presence in Indonesia and Djibouti.

It was founded in 1953. represented by the College of Sharia Sciences (now known as the College of Sharia) and has developed since then until it became a university in 1974. The foundation stone of its current university building was laid on 5 January 1982 during the reign of King Khalid Ibn Abdul-Aziz Al Saud. It was opened in 1990. The university includes 14 colleges, 3 higher institutes, 70 scientific institutes inside the Kingdom, and five institutes outside the Kingdom in Indonesia and Djibouti. It currently has more than 60,000 students and 4,000 faculty members.

History

In 1950, King Abdulaziz assigned Muhammad ibn Ibrahim to establish an Islamic institute in Riyadh. Imam Mohammad ibn Saud Islamic University was founded in 1974. The university was named after the emir of Diriyah and founder of First Saudi State, Muhammad bin Saud Al Muqrin.

Colleges

College of Engineering
 Department of Civil engineering
 Department of Mechanical Engineering
 Department of Electrical Engineering
 Department of Chemical Engineering
 Department of Architecture Engineering

College of Medicine
 Department of Pediatrics.
 Department of Internal Medicine.
 Department of Educational Medicine.
 Department of Pharmacology.
 Department of Anatomy.
 Department of Family and Community Medicine.
 Department of General Surgery.
 Department of Obstetrics and Gynecology.
 Department of Ophthalmology.
 Department of Dermatology.
 Department of Anesthesiology.
 Department of ENT.
 Department of Public health.
 Department of Clinical Neurosciences.
 Department of Pathology.
 Department of Biochemistry.
 Department of Forensic Medicine.
 Department of Emergency Medicine.
 Department of Physiology.

College of Computer and Information Sciences
 Department of Computer Science.
 Department of Information Systems.
 Department of Information Management.
 Department of Information Technology.

College of Sciences
 Department of Mathematics and Statistics.
 Department of Physics.
 Department of Chemistry.
 Department of Biology.

College of Economics and Administrative Sciences
 Department of Economics.
 Department of Business Administration.
 Department of Accounting.
 Department of Finance and Investment.
 Department of Banking.
 Department of Insurance and Risk Management.

College of Social Sciences
 Department of Psychology.
 Department of Sociology and Social Service.
 Department of History and Civilization.
 Department of Geography.

College of Arabic Language
 Department of Literature.
 Department of Rhetoric, Criticism and the Methodology of Islamic Literature.
 Department of Grammar and Linguistics.

College of Media and Communication
 Department of Journalism and Electronic Publishing
 Department of Radio, Television and Film
 Department of Public Relations
 Department of Advertising and marketing communication
 Department of Graphics and Multimedia
 Department of Specialized Media

College of Languages and Translation
 Department of English Language and Literature

College of Sharia
 Department of Sharia And Islamic studies.
 Department of Principles of Fiqh.
 Department of Fiqh.
 Department of Islamic Culture.
 Department of Laws.
College of the Fundamentals of Religion 
 Department of Holy Quran and its Sciences.
 Department of the Prophetic Sunnah and its Sciences.
 Department of Creed and Contemporary Doctrines.
College of Continuing Education and Community Services
 Department of Administrative Sciences and Humanities.
 Department of applied Sciences

College of Shari’ah [Divine Legislations] and Islamic Studies, Al-Ahsa Province
 Department of Divine Laws.
 Department of Fundamentals of Religion.
 Department of Arabic Language.
 Department of English Language.
 Department of Geography.
 Department of Administration.
 Department of Laws.
 Department of Computer Sciences and Information.

College of Education
 Department of Foundations of Education.
 Department of Educational Planning and Management.
 Department of Curricula and Teaching Methods.
 Department of Special Education.

Institutes
The Higher Institute of Judicial.
 Department of Comparative Jurisprudence.
 Department of Sharia Policy.
The Higher Institute of Dawah and Ihtisaab.
 Department of Preaching of Islam. 
 Department of Hisbah and Observation.
 Department of Contemporary Islamic Studies.
The Arabic Teaching Institute. 
 Department of Arabic Language and Islamic Sciences.
 Department of Language Preparation.
 Department of Applied Linguistics.

Student Aid and Housing

The university offers science and health major students 990 SR/month (264 $), and humanities students 840 SR/month (224 $), a 75% discount on foreign books, and fully furnished residences at the university housing/hostels complex, food within the university restaurant, free medical treatment, and full return tickets to their home country.

The university library is the Prince Sultan Library For Science and Knowledge. The library was founded in 1952, and was shared with a variety of schools in the city. The library is a partner of the World Digital Library.

Curriculum 

The university is organized into fourteen colleges. The fourteen colleges focus on: Shari'ah, Islam, Arabic language, social sciences, advocacy and media studies, language and translation, computer science and information science, economics and administrative sciences, formal science, medicine, and engineering. The University is home to the Institute of Translation and Arabization, a facility dedicated to the translation of Arabic texts to foreign languages, and translation of foreign language texts into Arabic (Arabization).

Extracurricular activities

The university publishes a newspaper named Mir'at al-Jami`ah (English: University Mirror).

Sports and traditions
Imam Mohammad bin Saud Islamic University has a football team, a volleyball team, and a stadium.

Notable alumni
 Abdulaziz al-Omari
 Abd Al-Aziz Fawzan Al-Fawzan
 Saleh Al-Fawzan
 Saud Al-Shuraim
 Abdullah Mohammed Al-Hugail
 Mohammad Al-Hasan bin Al-Dido Al-Shanqeeti
 Ahmed Bin Taleb Bin Hameed

 Muhammad Khayr Ramdan Yusef

References

External links
Official website

1974 establishments in Saudi Arabia
Educational institutions established in 1974
World Digital Library partners
Education in Riyadh
 
Islamic universities and colleges in Saudi Arabia